"Just One More Kiss" is a 1983 Renée and Renato song. The song reached No.48 in the UK charts.

References

Songs about kissing
1983 singles
1983 songs